Sukham Sukhakaram is a 1994 Indian Malayalam-language film, directed by Balachandra Menon and produced by R. Mohan. The film stars Urvashi, Balachandra Menon, Meera and Shammi Kapoor. The film has musical score by Ravindra Jain. It was simultaneously made in Tamil.

Cast
 
Urvashi 
Balachandra Menon 
Meera as Jaya
Shammi Kapoor 
Arun 
Sukumari 
Innocent 
A. C. Zainuddin 
Suchitra 
Mahesh 
Raja 
Prathapachandran 
Bheeman Raghu 
Kalpana 
Kaveri 
Kunchan 
Manjula Vijayakumar  as 
Mansoor Ali Khan 
Nagesh 
Ramu 
Riyaz Khan 
Shyama as Rosline
Suma Jayaram
T. P. Madhavan 
V. K. Sreeraman as Varmaji
Suryakanth 
Ramachandran
Suresh Gopi 
Geetha 
Vishnu Ravee

Soundtrack
The music was composed by Ravindra Jain.

References

External links
  
 

1994 films
1990s Malayalam-language films
Films directed by Balachandra Menon